Aarønes is a Norwegian surname. Notable people with the surname include:
 
Ann Kristin Aarønes (born 1973), Norwegian footballer
Karl Johan Aarønes (1900–1969), Norwegian politician

Norwegian-language surnames